Ramin Bahrani (born March 20, 1975) is an American director and screenwriter. Film critic Roger Ebert ranked Bahrani's Chop Shop (2007) as the sixth-best film of the 2000s, calling him "the new director of the decade". Bahrani was the recipient of the 2009 Guggenheim Fellowship. Bahrani is a professor of film directing at his alma mater the Columbia University School of the Arts.

In 2021, Bahrani was nominated for an Academy Award for Best Adapted Screenplay for The White Tiger. He is a BAFTA and Emmy Award nominee.

Early life and education
Bahrani was born in Winston-Salem, North Carolina, the son of Iranian immigrants. His father, originally from Shiraz, initially exposed him to the poetic works of Hafez and encouraged him to pursue his passion for the arts. He received his Bachelor of Arts degree from Columbia University in 1996. Bahrani also studied filmmaking in Iran and briefly lived in Paris after graduating from college.

Career 
Bahrani's first feature film, Man Push Cart (2005), premiered at the Venice Film Festival and screened at the Sundance Film Festival in 2006. The film won over 10 international prizes, was released theatrically around the world, and was nominated for three Independent Spirit Awards.

Bahrani's second film, Chop Shop (2007), premiered at the 2007 Director's Fortnight of the Cannes International Film Festival, and then screened at the Toronto International Film Festival (2007) and the Berlin International Film Festival (2008) before being released theatrically to wide and positive reviews. Bahrani won the 2007 Independent Spirit Someone to Watch Award, and was nominated for the 2008 Independent Spirit Best Director Award.

Goodbye Solo, Bahrani's third feature film, premiered as an official selection of the Venice Film Festival (2008) where it won the international film critics' FIPRESCI Award for Best Film, and later had its North American premiere at the Toronto International Film Festival (2008). The film was called a "masterpiece" by numerous critics including Roger Ebert, and A. O. Scott of The New York Times.

In 2009, he made a short film, Plastic Bag, with the voice of German filmmaker Werner Herzog and an original score from Kjartan Sveinsson of the band Sigur Rós. Plastic Bag premiered as the opening night film of Corto Cortissimo in the Venice Film Festival where Bahrani was also on the jury for Best First Films. It later screened at Telluride and The New York Film Festival. In 2012, he made a music video of the song "Eg anda" for the Sigur Rós album Valtari.

Bahrani's fourth feature film, At Any Price (2013) stars Dennis Quaid, Zac Efron, Heather Graham, Kim Dickens, Clancy Brown and Chelcie Ross. It was selected to compete for the Golden Lion at the 69th Venice International Film Festival. The film, despite its relative star power and a notable performance by Dennis Quaid, received mixed reviews from most critics and earned less than $500,000 at the box office.

Bahrani's fifth feature film, 99 Homes (2015), opened to strong reviews at the Venice Film Festival, and was nominated for a Golden Globe Award.

Bahrani's film for HBO, Fahrenheit 451, an adaptation of Ray Bradbury's 1953 dystopian novel of the same name, was released on May 12, 2018, receiving mostly negative reviews.

In 2021, he adapted Aravind Adiga's 2008 novel The White Tiger as a feature film of the same title on Netflix, to positive critical reception.

Filmography
Short films

Feature films

Television

Accolades
FIPRESCI Prize, London Film Festival (2005)
Someone to Watch Independent Spirit Award (2008)
FIPRESCI Prize, Venice Film Festival (2008)
Guggenheim Fellowship (2009)
United States Artists Fellow award (2010)

References

External links

1975 births
Columbia College (New York) alumni
Living people
Writers from Winston-Salem, North Carolina
American male screenwriters
Film directors from North Carolina
American writers of Iranian descent
Screenwriters from North Carolina
Iranian film directors
Iranian screenwriters